Sir John Banks, 1st Baronet  FRS (1627 – 18 October 1699) was an English merchant and MP, who rose from relatively humble beginnings to be one of the wealthiest merchants in London and owner of several properties.

Life
Banks was the son of Caleb Bankes (died 1669) of Maidstone, Kent, gent, and Martha Dann. He was educated at Emmanuel College, Cambridge.

About 1657, Banks married Elizabeth Dethick, daughter of Sir John Dethick. They had several children, including Caleb, Mary and Elizabeth. His son Caleb was MP for various constituencies, but predeceased him without issue in 1696.

Banks was created a baronet by King Charles II in 1661. He was elected a Fellow of the Royal Society in 1668.

He invested in the overseas trade with the East and with Africa and in 1677 was financially involved in an expedition to search for a North-east trade route. He was Governor of the East India Company in 1673–74.

Banks was Member of Parliament (MP) several times; for Maidstone 1654–1659, for Winchelsea 1678, for Rochester 1679–1690, for Queenborough 1690–1695 and again for Maidstone 1695–1698 

In 1672, he advocated for the rights of non-conformist congregations to be allowed to meet.

On Banks death in 1699 the baronetcy became extinct. He was survived by two married daughters (Mary, who had married John Savile and Elizabeth, who had married Heneage Finch) who were co-heiresses to his estate.

Notes

References 
 
 

1627 births
1699 deaths
Alumni of Emmanuel College, Cambridge
17th-century English businesspeople
Directors of the British East India Company
Fellows of the Royal Society
Baronets in the Baronetage of England
English MPs 1654–1655
English MPs 1656–1658
English MPs 1659
English MPs 1661–1679
English MPs 1679
English MPs 1681
English MPs 1685–1687
English MPs 1689–1690
English MPs 1695–1698